"Build God, Then We'll Talk" is the fifth and final official single from Panic! at the Disco's 2005 album A Fever You Can't Sweat Out, including the radio-only single "The Only Difference Between Martyrdom and Suicide Is Press Coverage".

Track listing
"Build God, Then We'll Talk" – 3:40
"Build God, Then We'll Talk" (Live in Denver) – 4:27

Song information
The song is the final song on Panic! at the Disco's debut album A Fever You Can't Sweat Out.

The bridge melody of "Build God, Then We'll Talk" is a derivative of the melody of the chorus of "My Favorite Things" from The Sound of Music. The lyrics in the bridge also directly satirize the lyrics of "My Favorite Things".

The song served as a closer in many of the band's shows during the touring cycle of A Fever You Can't Sweat Out. Following the release of their second album, Pretty. Odd., the song started to drop off from the band's set list, only appearing live occasionally. The song was not performed on the Honda Civic Tour in 2008, nor on the Rock Band Live Tour.

The song was later covered by the Vitamin String Quartet on the album Strung Out! The String Quartet Tribute to Panic! at the Disco.

Music video
The video director is unknown, but rumoured to be Andy Soup. The music video depicts the story of a "pornomime" and a girl who falls in love after she watches one of his performances. Their relationship is a mimed one. Both "relationships" encompass a false feeling of intimacy and are essentially devoid of meaning.

The mime and his girlfriend both walk in on each other having affairs (mimed, of course), again symbolizing the emptiness of their mimed relationships. They are not having sex with real people—it is an illusion. The video is the first from the band to be web-exclusive, mostly because they felt it was too vulgar for television, but it aired on MTV2 in the UK and on A1 in Russia. It was also available on Music Choice On-Demand.

The band does not appear in this video. Ryan Ross has also stated that he was annoyed that the video did not get any MTV airplay.

There have been several interpretations of this video, including references to a bad relationship by band member Brendon Urie.

References

External links

Musical parodies
2007 singles
Panic! at the Disco songs
Songs written by Ryan Ross
2005 songs
Songs written by Spencer Smith (musician)
Songs written by Brendon Urie
Fueled by Ramen singles